Fortuna Poiana Câmpina was a Romanian football club from Poiana Câmpina, Prahova County founded in 2010. The team was dissolved in the summer of 2015.

History

It was founded in the summer of 2012 under the name of Fortuna Brazi after a merger between Prahova 2010 Tomșani and Chimia Brazi. On August 2, 2013 it was announced that the club was moved from Brazi to Poiana Câmpina and changed its name from Fortuna Brazi to Fortuna Poiana Câmpina.

At the end of the 2013–14 Liga III season, the team gained promotion to Liga II, for the first time in their history.

Honours
Liga III:
Winners (1): 2013–14
Runners-up (1): 2012–13

Notable former players 

 Csaba Borbély
 Cristian Danci
 Bogdan Șandru
 Andrei Antohi

References

Association football clubs established in 2010
Association football clubs disestablished in 2015
Defunct football clubs in Romania
Football clubs in Prahova County
Câmpina